Yejju Oromo people  are a sub clan of the Barento branch of Oromo people. They are one of the northernmost communities of Oromo people residing in Ethiopia. 

During the 17th century, the Yejju dynasty, more specifically, the Warra Sheik, or sons of the Sheikh, ruled much of the Ethiopian Empire during the Zemene Mesafint or "Era of the Princes", changing the language in the court of Gondar to the Oromo language. Throughout the era, different ethnic groups, clans and communities made short-term alliances to acquire economic advantage and political power.The rulers of the Yejju dynasty were converts to Christianity, but their power base was the powerful Wollo Muslim principalities such as Yejju, Warra Himano, and Raayyaa.

As early as 1890, under the reign of Menelik II, the homeland of the Yejju was organized into an Ethiopian province (awrajja) named for them. It was bordered by the Alewuha River to the north, separating it from Raya Qobbo awrajja, the Mille River to the south, separating it from Were Babu district, the Afar Depression to the east, and the highlands of Ambassel to the west. Woldiya served as its capital city. With the adoption of ethnic federalism in 1994 and the abolishment of the awrajja administrative structure, Yejju became divided between the districts of Habru, Woldiya town, and the mid-altitude portion of Guba Lafto. Due to the assimilation of Yejju Oromos into the dominant Habesha culture beginning at the turn of the 19th century, the Yejju presently found in the Amhara Region overwhelmingly identify as Amharas.

References

Oromo groups
Ethnic groups in Ethiopia
Ethiopian noble families